Star Black is a poet, photographer, and artist. She has authored seven collections of poetry and taught in the MFA program at Stony Brook Southampton and at The New School.

She was published in The Paris Review, and has written three books of sonnets, a collection of double sestinas, and a book of collaged free verse. Her poems have been anthologized in The Penguin Book of the Sonnet, 110 Stories: New York Writers After September 11, and The Best American Erotic Poems: From 1880 to The Present. Her collages have been exhibited at Poets House and The Center for Book Arts, and published in One of a Kind: UniqueArtists Books by Pierre Menard Gallery.

Publications 
The Popular Vote (poems) (Saturnalia Press 2019)
Velleity's Shade (poems), with art work by Bill Knott – (Saturnalia Books 2010)
Ghostwood (sonnets) – (Melville House 2003)
Balefire (poetry) – (Painted Leaf Press 1999)
October for Idas (collaged free verse) – (Painted Leaf Press 1997)
Waterworn (sonnets) – (A Gathering of the Tribes 1995)
Double Time (double sestinas) – (Groundwater Press 1995)

Collages 
Stigmata Errata Electa, poems by Bill Knott, collages by Star Black - 2007

References

External links 
 Interview in The Morning News
 Four Poems in The Awl
 Poet's Eye Collage Exhibition at Poets House
 Glory in WashingtonArt
 Interview in The East Hampton Star
 Apexart Reading Series
 Poetryvlog Reading on YouTube
 Poetry Sunday: Star Black, Grown Up in Women Voices For Change
 Literarydc

 

Living people
American photographers
American women photographers
American women poets
Year of birth missing (living people)
21st-century American women